The 2nd Minnesota Infantry Regiment was a Minnesota USV infantry regiment that served in the Union Army during the American Civil War.

Service
The 2nd Minnesota Infantry Regiment was organized at Fort Snelling, Minnesota and mustered in by companies for three years service beginning June 26, 1861, under the command of Colonel Horatio P. Van Cleve. Companies A and B mustered in June 26, 1861; Companies D and E mustered July 5, 1861; Companies F and G mustered in July 8, 1861; Company H mustered in July 15, 1861; Company I mustered in July 20, 1861; and Company K mustered in August 23, 1861.

The regiment was attached to R. L. McCook's Brigade, Army of the Ohio, to December 1861. 3rd Brigade, 1st Division, Army of the Ohio, to September 1862. 3rd Brigade, 1st Division, III Corps, Army of the Ohio, to November 1862. 3rd Brigade, 3rd Division, Center, XIV Corps, Army of the Cumberland, to January 1863. 3rd Brigade, 3rd Division, XIV Corps, to October 1863. 2nd Brigade, 3rd Division, XIV Corps, to June 1865. 1st Brigade, 3rd Division, XIV Corps, to July 1865.

The 2nd Minnesota Infantry mustered out of service on July 11, 1865.

Detailed service

 Companies A and F sent to Fort Ripley on the upper Mississippi, Companies B and C to Fort Abercrombie on the upper Red River, and Companies D and E to Fort Ridgely on the upper Minnesota River, and garrison duty at these points until September 20, 1861. 
 Regiment concentrated at Fort Snelling and left Minnesota for Louisville, Ky., October 14, arriving there October 22. Moved to Lebanon Junction, Ky., October 22, and duty there until December 8. 
 Moved to Lebanon, Ky., December 8, 1861, and duty there until January 1, 1862. 
 Expedition to Somerset, January 1–18. 
 Battle of Mill Springs, January 19–20. 
 At Somerset until February 10. March to Louisville, Ky., February 10–25, thence moved to Nashville, Tenn., February 26-March 2. Moved to Savannah, Tenn., and Pittsburg Landing, Tenn., March 20-April 9. 
 Advance on and Siege of Corinth, Miss., April 29-May 30. 
 Pursuit to Booneville, May 31-June 12. At Corinth until June 22. 
 March to Iuka, Miss., June 22–25, thence to Tuscumbia, Ala., June 27–29, and duty there until July 26. 
 March to Athens, Ala., and Winchester, Tenn., July 26-August 7, thence to Dechard and Pelham Gap, Tenn., August 19–31, and to Manchester, Murfreesboro and Nashville, Tenn., September 1–7. 
 March to Louisville, Ky., in pursuit of Bragg September 14–26. Pursuit of Bragg into Kentucky October 1–20. 
 Battle of Perryville, Ky., October 8. 
 March to Bowling Green, Ky., October 20-November 2, thence to Mitchellsville November 6–7. 
 Guard Tunnel until November 23. 
 Moved to Cunningham's Ford, Cumberland River, November 23–25, and guard duty there until December 22, and at Gallatin until January 29, 1863. 
 Moved to Murfreesboro, Tenn., January 29, and duty there until March 2. Nolensville, February 15. 
 Moved to Triune March 2. Nolensville Ford, Harpeth River, March 4. 
 Expedition toward Columbia, March 4–14. Chapel Hill, March 5. At Triune until June 23. Franklin, June 4–5. 
 Tullahoma Campaign, June 23-July 7. Hoover's Gap, June 24–26. Occupation of Tullahoma, July 1. At Winchester, Tenn., until August 16. 
 Passage of Cumberland Mountains and Tennessee River and Chickamauga Campaign, August 16-September 22. 
 Battle of Chickamauga, September 19–20. Rossville Gap, September 21. 
 Siege of Chattanooga, Tenn., September 24-November 23. 
 Chattanooga-Ringgold Campaign, November 23–27. 
 Missionary Ridge, November 24–25. Pursuit to Ringgold, November 26–29. Regiment veteranized on December 29, 1863. 
 Veterans on furlough, January 8 to April 9, 1864. Non-veterans on duty as provost guard at Division Headquarters until April 1864. Reconnaissance from Ringgold, Ga., toward Tunnel Hill, April 29. 
 Atlanta Campaign, May l-September 8. 
 Tunnel Hill, May 6–7. Rocky Faced Ridge, May 8–11. 
 Battle of Resaca, May 13–15. Guard trains, May 21-June 2. About Dallas, June 2–5. 
 Operations about Marietta and against Kennesaw Mountain, June 10-July 2. Pine Hill, June 11–14. Lost Mountain, June 15–17. Assault on Kennesaw, June 27. 
 Ruff's Station, July 4. Garrison duty at Marietta until July 13. Assigned as provost and depot guard at Marietta, July 15-August 19. 
 March to Atlanta, August 19–20. Siege of Atlanta, August 20–25. Flank movement on Jonesboro, August 25–30. 
 Battle of Jonesboro, August 31-September 1. 
 Operations in North Georgia and North Alabama against Hood, September 29-November 3. 
 March to the Sea, November 15-December 10. Waynesboro, December 4. 
 Ebenezer Creek, December 8. 
 Siege of Savannah, December 10–21. 
 Campaign of the Carolinas, January to April 1865. Fayetteville, N.C., March 11. 
 Battle of Bentonville, March 19–21. Occupation of Goldsboro, March 24. 
 Advance on Raleigh, April 10–14. Occupation of Raleigh, April 14. 
 Bennett Place, April 26. Surrender of Johnston and his army, the largest surrender of Confederate soldiers at the end of the war. 
 March to Washington, D.C., via Richmond, Va., April 30-May 19.
 Grand Review of the Armies May 24. Moved to Louisville, Ky., June 14–20.

Casualties
The regiment lost a total of 281 men during service; 2 officers and 91 enlisted men killed or mortally wounded, 2 officers and 186 enlisted men died of disease.

Commanders
 Colonel Horatio P. Van Cleve - July 23, 1861, to March 21, 1862
 Colonel James George - May 15, 1862, to June 29, 1864
 Colonel Judson W. Bishop - March 5 to July 11, 1865

See also

 List of Minnesota Civil War Units
 Minnesota in the American Civil War

References
 Bircher, William. A Civil War Drummer Boy: The diary of William Bircher, 1861-1865 (Mankato, MN:  Blue Earth Books), 2000. 
 
 Bishop, J. W. Official Records Concerning the Second Regiment, Minnesota Veteran Volunteer Infantry, 1887 (St. Paul, MN:  H. M. Smyth Print. Co.), 1887.
 Bishop, J. W. The Story of a Regiment: Being a Narrative of the Service of the Second Regiment, Minnesota Veteran Volunteer Infantry, in the Civil War of 1861-1865 (St. Paul, MN: s.n.), 1890.
 Carley, Kenneth. Minnesota in the Civil War (St. Paul, MN: Minnesota Historical Society Press), 2000. 
 Donahower, J. C. Lookout Mountain and Missionary Ridge (Minnesota:  s.n.), 1898.
 Dyer, Frederick H. A Compendium of the War of the Rebellion (Des Moines, IA:  Dyer Pub. Co.), 1908.
 Griffin, D. B. Letters Home to Minnesota: 2nd Minnesota Vol. (Spokane, WA:  P. D. Enterprises), 1992. 
 Pendergast, T. H. Pen Pictures from the Second Minnesota: "Personal recollections by a private soldier" and "Marching thro' Georgia" (Roseville, MN:  Park Genealogical Books), 1998. 
Attribution

External links
 2nd Minnesota Infantry living history organization
 On this date in Civil War History: January 19, 1862 - Battle of Mill Springs (150th Anniversary)
 Minnesotans faced first combat action of Civil War at Mill Springs 150 years ago
 MNopedia article on the Second Minnesota
 Minnesota Historical Society resources on Minnesota and the Civil War

Military units and formations established in 1861
Military units and formations disestablished in 1865
Units and formations of the Union Army from Minnesota
1861 establishments in Missouri